The first election to Monaghan County Council took place in April 1899 as part of that year's Irish local elections.

Campaign
Under the Chairmanship of Col. John Leslie, the county Unionist Association met in early January to decide how to proceed, as there was an expectation that the party would be largely frozen out of the election, winning no more than five or six seats. As a result, the association attempted to build stronger links with Independent candidates, whilst also committing itself to contesting every possible seat. To achieve this, the association set up a Voters' Association, under the Honorary Presidency of W. Martin.

Aggregate results

Ward results

Aughabog

Ballybay

Ballymackay

Ballytrain

Broomfield

Carrickmacross

Castleblayney

Clones

Clontibret

Creeve

Cremarlin

Drum

Emyvale

Glasslough

Inniskeen

Killunan

Lough Fea

Newbliss

Scotstown

Tydavnet

References

County Monaghan
1899